Abdul-Rab al-Shadadi (1963 - 7 October 2016) was a Yemeni Army major general who served the President Abdrabbuh Mansur Hadi. He was the commander of the Third Military Region, which has its headquarters in the city of Marib. He is the most senior member of the Hadi government's forces to have been killed in the Yemeni Civil War. Al-Shadadi was killed in an artillery strike during an offensive east of the city of Sanaa by Houthi fighters.

References

1963 births
2016 deaths
People from Marib Governorate
Yemeni military personnel killed in the Yemeni Civil War (2014–present)
Yemeni generals